Blue Barnacle is a Metallbau Emmeln swinging pirate ship which opened in April 2021 at Chessington World of Adventures in southwest London, England as a replacement for the now defunct Black Buccaneer. The ride forms part of the Shipwreck Coast section of the park.

History 

Following the closure of Black Buccaneer at the end of 2018, it was quietly removed during the 2019 season. In January 2020, the park held a social media competition to name the attraction's replacement. Blue Barnacle was the winning name. Due to the COVID-19 pandemic, the new ride's intended opening of 2020 was postponed to 2021.

Description 

Blue Barnacle is a type of amusement ride consisting of an open, seated gondola (usually in the style of a pirate ship) which swings back and forth, subjecting the rider to various levels of angular momentum.

The attraction is manufactured by German company 'Metallbau Emmeln' and sports a blue, red and white colour scheme. The ride is 11m tall and can sit 42 riders per cycle, as well as a capacity of 650 riders per hour. Those between 1.1m and 1.3m must be accompanied by an adult over the age of 16, while those a minimum height of 1.3m can ride alone.

Gallery

References

External links 
 

Chessington World of Adventures rides
Amusement rides introduced in 2021
2021 establishments in the United Kingdom